Haloceras is a genus of sea snails, marine gastropod mollusks in the family Haloceratidae.

Species
 Haloceras acrocomatum Warén & Bouchet, 1991
 Haloceras carinatum (Jeffreys, 1883)
 Haloceras cingulatum (Verrill, 1884)
 † Haloceras contribule Bertolaso & Palazzi, 2000 
 Haloceras exquisitum Warén & Bouchet, 1991
 Haloceras galeritum Warén & Bouchet, 1991
 Haloceras heliptyx Warén & Bouchet, 1991
 Haloceras japonicum Okutani, 1964
 Haloceras laxum (Jeffreys, 1885)
 † Haloceras maxwelli Beu & B. A. Marshall, 2011 
 Haloceras mediocostatum (Dautzenberg & H. Fischer, 1896)
 Haloceras meteoricum Gofas, 2018
 Haloceras millestriatum (Okutani, 1964)
 Haloceras phaeocephalum Warén & Bouchet, 1991
 Haloceras rugosum Warén & Bouchet, 1991
 Haloceras spinosum Warén & Bouchet, 1991
 Haloceras tricarinatum (Jeffreys, 1885)
 Haloceras trichotropoides Warén & Bouchet, 1991
Synonyms
 Haloceras acrocomata Warén & Bouchet, 1991 : synonym of Haloceras acrocomatum Warén & Bouchet, 1991 (incorrect gender agreement of specific epithet)
 Haloceras carinata (Jeffreys, 1883) : synonym of Haloceras carinatum (Jeffreys, 1883) (incorrect gender agreement of specific epithet)
 Haloceras cingulata (Verrill, 1884) : synonym of Haloceras cingulatum (Verrill, 1884) (incorrect gender agreement of specific epithet)
 Haloceras contribulis Bertolaso & Palazzi, 2000 † : synonym of Haloceras contribule Bertolaso & Palazzi, 2000 † (incorrect gender agreement of specific epithet)
 Haloceras exquisita Warén & Bouchet, 1991 : synonym of Haloceras exquisitum Warén & Bouchet, 1991 (incorrect gender agreement of specific epithet)
 Haloceras galerita Warén & Bouchet, 1991 : synonym of Haloceras galeritum Warén & Bouchet, 1991 (incorrect gender agreement of specific epithet)
 Haloceras japonica Okutani, 1964 : synonym of Haloceras japonicum Okutani, 1964 (incorrect gender agreement of specific epithet)
 Haloceras laxa (Jeffreys, 1885) : synonym of Haloceras laxum (Jeffreys, 1885) (incorrect gender agreement of specific epithet)
 Haloceras mediocostata (Dautzenberg & H. Fischer, 1896) : synonym of Haloceras mediocostatum (Dautzenberg & H. Fischer, 1896) (incorrect gender agreement of specific epithet)
 Haloceras millestriata (Okutani, 1964) : synonym of Haloceras millestriatum (Okutani, 1964) (incorrect gender agreement of specific epithet)
 Haloceras phaeocephala Warén & Bouchet, 1991 : synonym of Haloceras phaeocephalum Warén & Bouchet, 1991 (incorrect gender agreement of specific epithet)
 Haloceras rugosa Warén & Bouchet, 1991 : synonym of Haloceras rugosum Warén & Bouchet, 1991 (incorrect gender agreement of specific epithet)
 Haloceras spinosa Warén & Bouchet, 1991 : synonym of Haloceras spinosum Warén & Bouchet, 1991 (incorrect gender agreement of specific epithet)
 Haloceras tricarinata (Jeffreys, 1885) : synonym of Haloceras tricarinatum (Jeffreys, 1885) (incorrect gender agreement of specific epithet)

References

External links
 Dall W.H. 1889. Reports on the results of dredging, under the supervision of Alexander Agassiz, in the Gulf of Mexico (1877-78) and in the Caribbean Sea (1879-80), by the U.S. Coast Survey Steamer "Blake", Lieut.-Commander C.D. Sigsbee, U.S.N., and Commander J.R. Bartlett, U.S.N., commanding. XXIX. Report on the Mollusca. Part 2, Gastropoda and Scaphopoda. Bulletin of the Museum of Comparative Zoölogy at Harvard College, 18: 1-492, pls. 10-40.
 Dall W.H. (1927). Small shells from dredgings off the southeast coast of the United states by the United States Fisheries Steamer "Albatross", in 1885 and 1886. i>Proceedings of the United States National Museum 70(2667): 1-134
 Warén, A.; Bouchet, P. (1991). Mollusca Gastropoda: Systematic position and revision of Haloceras Dall, 1889 (Caenogastropoda, Haloceratidae fam. nov.). in: Crosnier, A. et al. (Ed.) Résultats des Campagnes MUSORSTOM 7. Mémoires du Muséum national d'Histoire naturelle. Série A, Zoologie. 150: 111-161

Haloceratidae